The International Theater Company London (ITCL) is a theatrical company that performs in Japan since 1992. It is a collaboration between TNT Theater Britain, The American Drama Group Europe and Stageplay Japan.

Background

TNT, The New Theater, was founded in the 1980s. Later, TNT's artistic director MBE Paul Stebbings joined with ADG-Europe. In Japan, the tour is produced by StagePlay Japan, a production company led by producer Paulo Berwanger and his daughter Paula Berwanger.

In 2019, they performed A Midsummer Night's Dream, which was their 46th performance in Japan.
As Paul Stebbings describes the troupe: We have always been travelling players, influenced by styles and theories of theater that are not British or even restricted to one country.

Productions
A Midsummer Night's Dream
Romeo and Juliet
Twelfth Night
The Tempest
The Merchant of Venice
The Taming of the Shrew
King Lear
Macbeth
David Copperfield
Much Ado About Nothing
Pygmalion
Othello
A Christmas Carol
The Canterville Ghost
Hamlet
Animal Farm
Frankenstein
Oliver Twist
1984
The Fall of the House of Usher, The Tell-Tale Heart and The Pit and Pendulum
The Picture of Dorian Gray
Dr. Jekyll and Mr. Hyde
Brave New World
A Streetcar Named Desire
Gulliver's Travel
Animal Farm
The Murder of Sherlock Holmes

References 

Touring theatre